Rubenilson dos Santos da Rocha (born 23 September 1987), commonly known as Kanu, is a Brazilian footballer who plays as a midfielder for Belgian club Diest.

Club career
Before signing at Anderlecht, Kanu was on trial with FC Groningen. On 13 December 2008, he was loaned out to Cercle Brugge and on 30 June 2009 returned to Anderlecht.

In February 2014, Kanu agree to switch to Russian Premier League side Terek Grozny.

On 23 June 2017, Kanu signed a deal with the Cypriot First Division club Omonia Nicosia. He made his debut on 10 September 2017 against Ethnikos Achna on the 2017-18 season's premier and gave an assist to Matt Derbyshire for the winning goal.

On 31 January 2023, Kanu joined Diest in Belgium.

Statistics

Personal life
Kanu chose his football name as a reference to Nwankwo Kanu.

References

External links
10. Rubenilson Dos Santos da Rocha RSC Anderlecht
Rubenilson Dos Santos da Rocha stats Voebalkrant.com

1987 births
Sportspeople from Salvador, Bahia
Living people
Brazilian footballers
Association football forwards
Grêmio Barueri Futebol players
Clube Atlético Juventus players
R.S.C. Anderlecht players
Cercle Brugge K.S.V. players
FC Akhmat Grozny players
Buriram United F.C. players
AC Omonia players
K.V. Kortrijk players
Al-Raed FC players
P.O. Xylotymbou players
Sociedade Desportiva Juazeirense players
K. Rupel Boom F.C. players
K.F.C. Diest players
Belgian Pro League players
Russian Premier League players
Cypriot First Division players
Saudi Professional League players
Cypriot Second Division players
Campeonato Brasileiro Série D players
Belgian National Division 1 players
Brazilian expatriate footballers
Expatriate footballers in Belgium
Brazilian expatriate sportspeople in Belgium
Expatriate footballers in Russia
Brazilian expatriate sportspeople in Russia
Expatriate footballers in Thailand
Brazilian expatriate sportspeople in Thailand
Expatriate footballers in Cyprus
Brazilian expatriate sportspeople in Cyprus
Expatriate footballers in Saudi Arabia
Brazilian expatriate sportspeople in Saudi Arabia